Sarah Will is a paralympic skier who spent 11 years on the U.S. Disabled Ski Team. During this time, she earned a record 13 medals (12 gold, 1 silver) while competing in four Winter Paralympic Games between 1992 and 2002. She was named to the United States Olympic Hall of Fame in July 2009 and is also a member of the U.S. Ski and Snowboard Hall of Fame.

Will serves as an accessibility consultant, public speaker and is an adaptive guest coach throughout the globe. Sarah is an advocate for people with disabilities in the Vail community.

Life 
She became paralyzed in 1988 in a skiing accident.

Sarah was one of the first adaptive athletes to compete at the XGames in the first ever Monoskier X cross, where she earned a bronze medal in the women's category. The following year she placed 4th in the open Monoskier X Cross, being the only woman in a field of 16 competitors.  

After retiring from competition, Will worked as a commentator for ESPN's XGames. Sarah also served as a commentator for NBC Universal Sports coverage of the Paralympic games in Vancouver, BC and the following games in Sochi, Russia. 

In her spare time, Sarah enjoys painting, mainly for charity events.

See also
Athletes with most gold medals in one event at the Paralympic Games

References

Living people
American female alpine skiers
Paralympic alpine skiers of the United States
Alpine skiers at the 1992 Winter Paralympics
Alpine skiers at the 1994 Winter Paralympics
Alpine skiers at the 1998 Winter Paralympics
Alpine skiers at the 2002 Winter Paralympics
Paralympic gold medalists for the United States
Paralympic silver medalists for the United States
Medalists at the 1992 Winter Paralympics
Medalists at the 1994 Winter Paralympics
Medalists at the 1998 Winter Paralympics
Medalists at the 2002 Winter Paralympics
People with paraplegia
Sit-skiers
Year of birth missing (living people)
Paralympic medalists in alpine skiing
21st-century American women